This was the first edition of the event.

Sandy Mayer and Frew McMillan won the title, defeating Tracy Delatte and Chris Dunk 4–6, 6–3, 6–3 in the final.

Seeds

  Brian Gottfried /  Sherwood Stewart (semifinals)
  Kevin Curren /  Steve Denton (final)
  Sandy Mayer /  Frew McMillan (champions)
  Rod Frawley /  Andrés Gómez (first round)

Draw

Draw

References
Draw

1981 Grand Prix (tennis)
Donnay Indoor Championships